The Alsancak-Halkapınar Shuttle (Alsancak-Halkapınar Ring Train) is a shuttle train operated by İZBAN to service Alsancak Terminal. As of June 10, 2012, İZBAN's mainline will temporarily bypass Alsancak, due to the construction of a new transfer station near Hilal. Until the station is complete, shuttle trains will operate every 10–12 minutes between Alsancak and Halkapınar, where passengers can transfer to other trains.

References

Passenger rail transport in Turkey